Albemarle Bertie may refer to:

 Albemarle Bertie (MP) (c. 1668–1742), MP for Lincolnshire 1705–1708, Cockermouth 1708–1710 and Boston 1734–1741

 Albemarle Bertie, 9th Earl of Lindsey (1744–1818), Army officer and MP for Stamford 1801–1909
 Sir Albemarle Bertie, 1st Baronet (1755–1824), British admiral

See also
Bertie (surname)